Bartlett's Harbour  is a local service district and designated place in the Canadian province of Newfoundland and Labrador that is northeast of Pointe Riche on the island of Newfoundland. There was a lobster packing establishment and the Reid-Newfoundland Steamers called weekly by 1911. The village became a Canadian Post Office in 1949, on April 1. It was served by the C.N.R Express after June 1953. It had a population of 50 in 1911, 57 by 1940, 106 in 1951 and 146 in 1956.

Geography 
Bartletts Harbour is in Newfoundland within Subdivision C of Division No. 9.

Demographics 

Government 
Bartletts Harbour is a local service district (LSD) that is governed by a committee responsible for the provision of certain services to the community. The chair of the LSD committee is Lyman Caines.

See also 
List of communities in Newfoundland and Labrador
List of designated places in Newfoundland and Labrador
List of local service districts in Newfoundland and Labrador

References 

Designated places in Newfoundland and Labrador
Local service districts in Newfoundland and Labrador